Changyu Pioneer Wine Co. Inc., located in Yantai, Shandong, is China's oldest and largest winery. It was founded in 1892 by Cheong Fatt Tze (Zhang Bishi).

History 
Zhang Bishi established the winery in Yantai in 1892. He bought 2,000 plants from the United States, but few bore fruit and were not sweet enough. As well, half of the vines rotted away before harvest, so he bought 640,000 more from Europe.  Even these plants found difficulty growing in the foreign Chinese soil that only 20 to 30% of them survived.

In order to save the venture, Zhang sent for and brought back wild plants from northeast China, plants that produced a bitter fruit.  They were grafted to the foreign plants and, after three years, they were planted in the Shandong vineyards.  The new vines survived, granting fruit rich in sugar with good color and were insect, disease, and cold resistant.

People 
Zhang Bishi (1841–1916) - The founder of Changyu Company.
He was an important overseas Chinese diplomat, having a high-level position in the Qing Dynasty.  He devoted his life to his motherland by developing Chinese industry.  In 1892, he invested three million liang of silver to establish Changyu Winemaking Company, which was the beginning of the Chinese wine industry.

Zhang Chengqing (1872–1914) - The First General Manager of Changyu Company.
He was the nephew of Zhang Bishi and a fourth rank official of the Qing Dynasty.  The Grand Cellar was built, 3,000 hectares of premium vineyards, and dozens of different products were developed during his term.

Mr. Balboa (Belgium) - Changyu's First Winemaker.

Zhang Zizhang (China) - Changyu's First Chinese Winemaker.

Lenz M. Moser(Austria)- Chief Enologist of Ningxia Chateau Changyu Moser XV.

John Salvi(Italy)- Honorary Head and Chief Enologist of Xinjiang Chateau Changyu Baron Balboa.

AugustusReina (Italy)- Chief Enologist of Shaanxi Chateau Changyu Rena .

Gohadi Fagnani(France)- Chief Enologist of Beijing Chateau Changyu AFIP Global.

Albert Milan(Canada)- Chief Enologist of Liaoning Chateau Changyu Golden Icewine Valley.

Norbert Buchonnet(France)- Chief Enologist of Yantai Chateau Changyu-Castel .

The Grand Cellar 
The Grand Cellar was first built in 1894. Although it needed to be rebuilt three times in the first 11 years, it has lasted for more than 100 years.  It is considered a great historical landmark in Chinese architecture, with its creative design and construction work praised by both Chinese and foreign engineering experts.

The Grand Cellar is 1,976 square metres in size and seven metres in depth.  The ground of the cellar is one metre below sea level and the whole of the cellar is no more than 100 metres away from the sea.  It maintains a constant temperature and humidity throughout the year and is ideal for wine maturation.  Still in use today, thousands of oak barrels arranged around the cellar, with three of them large enough to store 15 tonnes of wine each.

Wineries

Chateau Changyu-Castel 
Located at the Beiyujia Village of the Yantai Economic and Technical Development Zone, Chateau Changyu-Castel has a total are 135 hectares of vineyards and large wine-making chateau. Following the traditional European chateau style, the design of the square, the interior decoration and the wine tasting room was made by Mr. Micel Mirande, a member of the French Architecture Association.
The primary grape variety is Cabernet Gernischt, introduced from Europe over 100 years ago.

Chateau Changyu-AFIP 
Located just to the northeast of Beijing, Chateau Changyu-AFIP is Changyu's newest chateau and is regarded by the OIV as the 'new model of global chateau'.

Golden Icewine Valley 
The area around Hanlong Lake in Liaoning is recognized as "golden ice wine valley" or "eastern Ontario". Currently, there are more than 5,000 hectares of ice wine vineyard at an altitude of 380 meters. The adjacent lake ensures that the weather is cold, but not too dry.
The primary grape variety is Vidal, introduced by Aurora, a Canadian wine company.

Chateau Changyu Moser XV 

Located near Yinchuan in the Ningxia wine region, Chateau Changyu Moser XV is a high-end complex chateau integrated with grape planting, high-end wine making, wine culture exhibition, wine tasting, conference reception and tourism integrated in one. In March 2013, UK royal wine dealer Berry Brothers & Rudd listed the Changyu Moser XV wines, making Moser XV the first Chinese chateau that has entered into European market.

Chateau Changyu Moser XV is the cooperation between Changyu as the pioneering premiere Chinese winery and Lenz M. Moser 5th generation of the Austrian winemaking Moser Family and 15th generation direct lineage to Moser Family.

Chateau Changyu Baron Balboa 
Named after the first wine maker - Baron Balboa, Xinjiang Chateau Changyu Baron Balboa lies in Nanshan New District, Shihezi City. It is a large-scale modern chateau serving for grape cultivating, wine making and sales, culture communication and tourism. The unique gobi gravel soil and sunshine comparable with Bordeaux in the region allow the chateau to produce 13.5 degree wine every year.

Chateau Changyu Rena 
Named after the Rena family, its brewing technology partner and a historic Italian wine making family, Shaanxi Chateau Changyu Verna is located in Weicheng district of Xianyang City. Augustus, a descendant of the family, serves as Chief Enologist of the chateau. With unique "changing-barrel" technology, the wine stored in barrels from over 20 different origins and in different degree of roasting are in the optimal balance.

Changyu Kely 
Located in New Zealand.

References 

Wineries of China
Companies based in Shandong
Chinese brands
Wine brands
1892 establishments in China